Ronny König (born 2 June 1983) is a German professional footballer who plays as a striker for FSV Zwickau.

Career 
König was born in Lichtenstein, East Germany.

He made his debut on the professional league level in the 2. Bundesliga for SV Wehen Wiesbaden on 17 August 2007 when he came on as a substitute in the 64th minute in a game against VfL Osnabrück.

Career statistics

References

External links
 
 

1983 births
Living people
People from Zwickau (district)
People from Bezirk Karl-Marx-Stadt
Association football forwards
German footballers
Footballers from Saxony
Chemnitzer FC players
SV Wehen Wiesbaden players
FC Erzgebirge Aue players
1. FC Kaiserslautern II players
Rot-Weiß Oberhausen players
SV Darmstadt 98 players
FSV Zwickau players
2. Bundesliga players
3. Liga players